Vesa Kokko (born  in Tampere) is a Finnish male wheelchair curler and curling coach.

As a coach of Finnish wheelchair curling team he participated in 2018 Winter Paralympics.

Teams

Record as a coach of national teams

References

External links

 Video: 

Living people
1964 births
Sportspeople from Tampere
Finnish male curlers
Finnish wheelchair curlers
Finnish curling champions
Finnish curling coaches
21st-century Finnish people